Her Elephant Man is a 1920 American silent drama film directed by Scott R. Dunlap and starring Shirley Mason, Alan Roscoe, Henry Hebert, Ardita Mellinina, and Harry Todd. It is based on the 1919 novel Her Elephant Man: A Story of the Sawdust Ring by Pearl Doles Bell. The film was released by Fox Film Corporation in February 1920.

Cast
Shirley Mason as Joan
Alan Roscoe as Colonel Philip Dorset
Henry Hebert as Blake
Ardita Mellinina as The Bride
Harry Todd as Jerimy
Dorothy Lee as Trixie

Preservation
The film is now considered lost.

References

External links

1920 drama films
Silent American drama films
1920 films
American silent feature films
American black-and-white films
Lost American films
Fox Film films
Films based on American novels
1920 lost films
Lost drama films
1920s American films